"Closer" is a pop-rock song that Robin Grubert and Martin Tingvall wrote for the German singer Mandy Capristo. The play, which Robin Grubert and Martin Tingvall was produced, 2012 published on Capristos debut album Grace and released as the second single.

Background 
Capristo first presented on 20 July 2012, the song Closer than Voract James Morrison prior to 3000 visitors. Similarly, the song was on the EMI Best of Summer Hits Compilation 29th Published in June. The radio premiere was held on 9 August. On 27 Published August Capristo the acoustic version to Closer. She was accompanied by the pianist and cellist Nicolas Kozuschek Cornelius Thiem. This is now the fourth Acoustic single from their album Grace. Capristo said of Closer: "The song is intended to provide simple, that you are more happy about things that you have to remembers it and not taking anything for granted accepts. I also had the point in my life where all my material needs were met and I was not happy. As it did click and I reconsidered what is really important to me."

Video Shoot 
The video shoot took place on 9 June 2012, the video was the first time the second August aired on MyVideo. A total of four different scenes were filmed. At the beginning of the video takes place in a new apartment, Capristo and her boyfriend (played by Thando Walbaum) set them up straight. The second scene begins in a bar Capristo is again with her boyfriend and wearing a long cocktail dress. Then tilts the mood as her boyfriend flirting with another woman appears, and then leaves the room. He returns with Capristo ran furiously out of the bar a car racing towards them. Your friend saves her by jumping in front of them. Then he is taken to hospital and is in a coma. Capristo visits him every day and leaves him on little sticky notes love messages. The last setting is ended with the resounding beats of the victim. It remains unclear whether this will wake up. Capristos fans could determine the end of the video. Either her lover remains in a coma, or he wakes up again.

Track listings
Digital download
"Closer (Radio Edit) " - 3:37
"Closer (Acoustic Version) " - 4:30
"Hurricane (Acoustic Version) " - 3:48
"Overrated (Acoustic Version) " - 3:55
"Be You " - 3:37
"Closer (Video) " - 4:12
CD single
"Closer (Radio Edit) " - 3:37
"Closer (Acoustic Version) " - 4:30
"Hurricane (Acoustic Version) " - 3:48
"Overrated (Acoustic Version) " - 3:55
"Be You " - 3:37

Charts

Release history

References

2012 singles
2012 songs
EMI Records singles